New Zealand–Philippines relations refer to bilateral relations between New Zealand and the Philippines. The Philippines has an embassy in Wellington and 2 other consulates, one in Auckland and in Christchurch and New Zealand has an embassy in Manila. Both countries are members of Asia-Pacific Economic Cooperation.

Military relations

New Zealand and the Philippines fought together during the Korean War (1950–1953) under a UN-led police action to counter a North Korean invasion of South Korea.

During the course of the Cold War, New Zealand and the Philippines were both part of the Southeast Asia Treaty Organization from 1954 to 1977. The Royal New Zealand Air Force has also conducted exercises in the Philippines.

Economic relations

New Zealand's total exports to the Philippines in 2010 amounted to about US$475 million representing a 30% increase from 2009 making the Philippines one of their major export market.

Philippine Foreign Affairs Secretary Albert del Rosario made a two-day official visit to New Zealand upon the invitation of Foreign Minister Murray McCully. The Secretary noted the increasing business activities between the Philippines and New Zealand as more companies in both countries explore and engage in business and investment opportunities in the dairy, information technology, geothermal and other sectors.

State visit

In October 2012, President Benigno Aquino III made a state visit to New Zealand. He witnessed the signing of three bilateral agreements meant to further strengthen diplomatic relations between Manila and Wellington. The signing followed a bilateral meeting between President Aquino and Prime Minister John Key, both held at the Parliament Building. The accords deal with a reciprocal working holiday scheme, defense cooperation and geothermal energy.

Police assistance
In 2009, the New Zealand Police was helping the Philippine National Police combat methamphetamine. The New Zealand Police also helps in providing training to the Philippine National Police.

Migration
In 2013, there were over 40,000 Filipinos residing in New Zealand.

The 1936 New Zealand census found six New Zealand residents born in the Philippines, and the country's intake of Filipino students began to increase in 1960, under the Colombo Plan; however, even as late as 1981, there were only 405 Filipinos in New Zealand. It would take until the 1990s before highly populated regions such as Wellington and Auckland (especially the suburbs of Henderson and Mount Roskill) began to see exponential growth in their respective Filipino communities. The communities themselves are known for their many Philippine-related celebrations, particularly the celebration of Philippine Independence Day every year on the Sunday nearest to 12 June. In April 2008, New Zealand's embassy indicated that they would like to increase the intake of nurses and engineers from the Philippines.

See also 
 Filipino New Zealander

References

External links
 New Zealand Embassy Manila
 Filipinos in New Zealand Website

 
Philippines
Bilateral relations of the Philippines